La Paz Centro is a town and a municipality in the León Department of Nicaragua.

The town is located along the highway between Managua and León. The small municipality is known for its small shops and pottery. La Paz Centro is the home of the Asososca Lagoon Natural Reserve, which is one of the few water reserves in Nicaragua that remains uncontaminated. La Paz Centro and the bordering town Nagarote are in a feud between which town makes the best quesillos.

The town was the site of a battle between American Marines and Nicaraguan Liberal rebels in the aftermath of the Nicaraguan Civil War (1926–1927) on May 16, 1927, prior to the Sandino Rebellion.

References 

Municipalities of the León Department